The Athlete's Foot (TAF) is a global retailer of athletic inspired lifestyle and streetwear — footwear, apparel and accessories. Its global headquarters are located Stans, Switzerland and US headquarters in Atlanta, Georgia.

In 1971, David Lando realized that athletic shoes were by far the highest selling product in his store. That year, he and his son, Michael Lando, opened the first The Athlete's Foot store in Pittsburgh, Pennsylvania. It was the first athletic footwear specialty store of its kind in the United States. Soon thereafter, The Athlete's Foot began expanding in the United States. Among Lando's partners were his brother Robert and Sidney Gilbert of Rochester, New York. The first international franchise store opened in 1978 in Adelaide, Australia, the beginning of The Athlete's Foot expansion across the world.

Today, The Athlete's Foot is present in 30 countries across the world with over 550 stores, from United States and Australia, to Europe, Asia, Middle East and Latin America.

In 2012, the brand was acquired by Intersport International Corporation (IIC), the world's largest sporting goods retail group, headquartered in Bern, Switzerland. In 2021, Intersport sold The Athlete's Foot business to the Arklyz Group.

Strategic Brand partners of The Athlete's Foot include Nike, Adidas, Reebok, Asics, New Balance, Converse, Puma SE and Vans.

Stores

References

External links

Sporting goods retailers
Retail companies established in 1971
Companies based in Atlanta
1971 establishments in Pennsylvania
2006 mergers and acquisitions
2012 mergers and acquisitions
2021 mergers and acquisitions